CST or Cst may refer to:

Time zones
 Central Standard Time, North America: UTC−06:00
 China Standard Time: UTC+08:00
 Cuba Standard Time: UTC−04:00

Government and politics 
 Canada Social Transfer, an equalization payment
 Collective Security Treaty of the Commonwealth of Independent States
 Sandinista Workers' Centre, in Nicaragua
 Socialist Workers' Current, in Brazil

Health and medicine 
 Canadian Society of Transplantation
 Captopril suppression test
 Cavernous sinus thrombosis
 Cell Signaling Technology, a US company
 Certified Sex Therapist
 Certified surgical technologist
 Contraction stress test in obstetrics
 Council for Science and Technology of the UK government
 Craniosacral therapy
 CST complex, a protein trimer

Science and technology 
 Cambridge Systems Technology, Former UK computing company
 Centistokes (cSt), a unit of kinematic viscosity
 Certification for Sustainable Transportation, University of Vermont, US
 Concept of Stratification
 Concrete Syntax Tree
 Common Spanning Tree, a networking technology
 Computer Simulation Technology, a maker of computational electromagnetics software
 Constant strain triangle element, in finite element analysis
 Cross-species transmission

Transportation
 Cargo Sous Terrain, a planned underground logistics system in Switzerland
 Stockholm Central Station (station code Cst)
 Chhatrapati Shivaji Terminus, Mumbai, India
 Coast Air of Norway (ICAO designator CST)
 Cannon Street station, London, England

Other uses
 California Standards Test
 Catholic social teaching
 Center for Survivors of Torture, an American charity
 Cheng Shin Tire, Taiwan
 Chicago Shakespeare Theater
 Child sex tourism
 Church of Spiritual Technology, Scientology company
 Civil Support Team, US
 Claremont School of Theology,  California, US
 Community Security Trust, a UK Jewish charity
 Cox Sports Television
 Czechoslovak Television, ČST